Flodigarry is a scattered settlement on the north east side of the Trotternish peninsula on the island of Skye, and is in the Scottish council area of Highland.

In 1750 the Jacobite Flora MacDonald and her fiancé Allan MacDonald were married and lived in a cottage in Flodigarry.

Notes

Populated places in the Isle of Skye